DXPH (98.9 FM), broadcasting as 98.9 Mystical FM, is a radio station in the Philippines owned and operated by the Government of Dinagat Islands through its Provincial Information Office. The station's studio and transmitter are located at the Annex Bldg., Provincial Capitol, Brgy. Cuarenta, San Jose, Dinagat Islands. It serves as a community radio station of Dinagat Islands.

References

Radio stations established in 2019